Subuluridae is a family of spirurian nematodes which, together with the two species of Maupasinidae, make up the superfamily Subuluroidea. Like all nematodes, they have neither a circulatory nor a respiratory system.

They number about one dozen genera and somewhat over 100 species, and are parasites of amniotes, chiefly birds and mammals.

Systematics
Several subfamilies are very small or even monotypic, and might not be valid. Spiruroides might actually belong in the Gongylonematidae, which are not closely related to the Subuluridae as far as Spiruria go.

Subfamily Allodapinae Inglis, 1958
 Allodapa Diesing, 1861
 Aulonocephalus Chandler, 1935
Subfamily Labiobulurinae Quentin, 1969
 Cyclobulura Quentin, 1977
 Labiobulura Skrjabin & Schikhobalova, 1948
 Tarsubulura Inglis, 1958
Subfamily Leipoanematinae Chabaud, 1957
 Leipoanema Johnston & Mawson, 1942

Subfamily Parasubulurinae Berghe & Vuylsteke, 1938
 Parasubulura Berghe & Vuylsteke, 1938
Subfamily Subulurinae Travassos, 1914
 Inglisubulura Devamma, 1977
 Oxynema Linstow, 1899
 Primasubulura Inglis, 1958
 Spiruroides Cameron & Parnell, 1933 (tentatively placed here)
 Subulura Molin, 1860
 Travassallodapa López-Neyra, 1945

Footnotes

References 
  (2007): Family Subuluridae. Version of 2007-AUG-07. Retrieved 2008-NOV-05.

Ascaridida
Nematode families